The name Sinlaku has been used for four tropical cyclones in the Western Pacific Ocean. The name was contributed by the Federated States of Micronesia and means Kosrae, a legendary goddess.
 Typhoon Sinlaku (2002) (T0216, 22W) – struck China
 Typhoon Sinlaku (2008) (T0813, 15W, Marce) – struck Taiwan and approached Japan
 Tropical Storm Sinlaku (2014) (T1421, 22W, Queenie) – struck Philippines and Vietnam
 Tropical Storm Sinlaku (2020) (T2003, 04W) – a weak tropical storm that affected southern China and northern Vietnam.

Pacific typhoon set index articles